Dil Deke Dekho (English : Look unto heart) is an Indian sitcom, which premiered on 18 October 2016 and ended on 12 June 2017 on SAB TV. This Hindi TV Serial was produced by Manish Goswami.

Plot
This show highlights evolutionary love approach limiting to three generations by giving an example through two families, the Chopras and the Shastris.

Cast
 Anju Jadhav as Preet Shastri 
 Abhishek Bajaj as Rahul Shastri 
 Preet Kaur Madhan as Simran Chopra, Rahul's aunt
 Amit Tandon as Kamal Chopra, Preet's uncle
 Navneet Nishan as Tulsi Chopra, Preet's grandmother
 Kanwaljit Singh as Hridayanath Shastri, Rahul's grandfather
 Jiten Lalwani as Sheri Chopra, Preet's father
 Jaswinder Gardner as Bubbly Chopra, Preet's mother
 Chetanya Adib as Atal Shastri, Rahul's father
 Ritu Vashisht  as Mohini Shastri, Rahul's mother
 Nabeel Ahmed as Signal

References

2016 Indian television series debuts
Hindi-language television shows
Indian drama television series
Sony SAB original programming
Indian television sitcoms
Television shows set in Mumbai
2017 Indian television series endings